Carl Fabian "Fabbe" Biörck (21 October 1893 – 27 September 1977) was a Swedish gymnast who won a team gold medal in the Swedish system event at the 1920 Summer Olympics. He was also the 1917 Swedish champion in the 400 m sprint.

References

1893 births
1977 deaths
Swedish male artistic gymnasts
Gymnasts at the 1920 Summer Olympics
Olympic gymnasts of Sweden
Olympic gold medalists for Sweden
Olympic medalists in gymnastics
Medalists at the 1920 Summer Olympics
Sportspeople from Jönköping